Abdel Wael Zwaiter (2 January 1934 – 16 October 1972) was a Palestinian translator, assassinated as the first target of Israel's Operation Wrath of God campaign following the 1972 Munich massacre. Israel considered Zwaiter a terrorist for his role in the Black September group, while his supporters argue that he was "never conclusively linked" with Black September or the Munich massacre and was killed in retribution.

Zwaiter was born in Nablus in 1934, the son of Adel Zu'aiter. He went to Iraq and studied Arabic literature and philosophy at the University of Baghdad.  Zwaiter moved then to Libya and afterwards to Rome, where he was a PLO representative and worked as a translator for the Libyan embassy.  In addition to his native Arabic, Zwaiter spoke French, Italian, and English.  During his time in Italy, Zwaiter was in the process of translating One Thousand and One Nights from Arabic into Italian, but according to Emily Jacir, he never completed this.

Zwaiter was held for questioning by Italian police in August 1972 in relation to a bombing by the group Black September against an oil refinery, but was later released.  The Israeli Mossad suspected him of being the head of Black September in Rome, and put him on an assassination list after Black September's attack in Munich. When he returned to his apartment building on the night of 16 October 1972, he was killed by two Israeli agents who shot him 11 times.

At the time, Zwaiter was the PLO representative in Italy, and while Israel privately claimed he was a member of Black September and was involved in a failed plot against an El Al airliner, members of the PLO have argued that he was in no way connected. Abu Iyad, deputy-chief of the PLO, has stated that Zwaiter was "energetically" against political violence.

Portrayal in film
Wael Zwaiter is portrayed by actor Makram Khoury in Steven Spielberg's Munich.
"Material for a film": Retracing Wael Zuaiter (Part 1), installation in the 2007 La Biennale di Venezia by Emily Jacir
Emily Jacir:  "Material for a film": A performance (Part 2), 16 July 2007, The Electronic Intifada
Najwan Darwis: Emily Jacir’s Material for a Film: Ongoing homage and artistic revenge for Wa’el Zuaiter

References

Klein, Aaron J. Striking Back: The 1972 Munich Olympics Massacre and Israel's Deadly Response. New York: Random House, Inc., 2005.

Further reading
Janet Venn-Brown (ed.) (English): For a Palestinian: A Memorial to Wael Zuaiter, 1984. 
Khalidi, Walid (1984): Before Their Diaspora: A Photographic History of the Palestinians, 1876-1948. Institute for Palestine Studies. (Has picture of Wael Zuaiter as a child with his father and brother, see also here (scroll down the page). 
Nico Perrone: In memoria di Wael e di Nablus, in il manifesto (daily), Rome, September 9, 1993.

1934 births
1972 deaths
Deaths by firearm in Italy
Assassinated Palestinian people
Arabic–Italian translators
Palestinian people murdered abroad
People murdered in Italy
People from Nablus
People killed in Mossad operations
Palestinian translators
University of Baghdad alumni
20th-century translators
20th-century male writers
Palestinian expatriates in Jordan